Gilbert Gaul may refer to:
Gilbert Gaul (artist) (1855–1919), American artist
Gilbert M. Gaul (born 1951), American journalist